Gian Francesco Fortunati (Parma, 27 February 1746 - 20 December 1821) was an Italian opera composer, maestro di cappella of the court at Parma.

References

Italian Classical-period composers
1746 births
1821 deaths